Onze Estrelas Boa Vista or Onze Estrelas Clube de Bofareira (Portuguese meaning Eleven Stars) is a football (soccer) club that currently plays in the Campeonato Nacional de Cabo Verde and in the Boa Vista Island League in Cape Verde. It is based on the island of Boa Vista and plays in the stadium with a capacity of 1,000 though the village they play is for Bofareira.  Its current manager is Tó Monteiro.

Logo
Its logo color is light green with a green flower in the middle and the middle, outside the eleven stars representing the main islands of Cape Verde and on the bottom reads unidos para vencer (union for winning).

History
The club was founded on 5 April 1976 by a group of young people from an abandoned village named Espingueira.  In July 2010, they would form an association to compete in regional matches.  Their first appearance into the insular division was during the 2010–11 season and is the island's most recent appearance of any new team today, the club finished second that season, Onze Estrelas finished third.  The team would win their first and only championship title for the island of Boa Vista in 2013 and elevated to the national competition for the first and only time and would be ranked fourth.  A year later they would also win the island's first and only cup title, at the regional super cup, the club lost to Académica Operária.  Onze Estrelas finished fourth in the 2014–15 season behind África Show.  Djo Bracó who coached previous clubs including Sal Rei FC in 2004 became the manager for the 2015–16 season and the club finished for the third time being third with 24 points, behind Académica Operária.  In December 2016, Tó Monteiro became manager of the club. Onze Estrelas got a success and took the number one position after a win over Estância Baixo on January 28, 2017, their position lasted until March 19, earlier a draw with Juventude slowed the success and after a loss to Sanjoanense placed the club second.  Along with Académica Operária, had 21 points, Onze Estrela scored 27 goals while the other scored only ten at the 11th round.  On April 1, the club defeated Estância Baixo 0–7 and made the region's highest scoring match, the club was second place with 21 points behind Sal Rei and got their final total of 27 points.  The final round would be placed fourth for the fourth time and had 27 goals scored again and had 27 points, more successful than the previous three seasons, its goal totals were second behind Sal Rei and ahead of Africa Show.

The club received five awards from the Gala do Desporte de Boa Vista, including best player and the insular championship in 2014.

Onze Estrelas lost the 2016 Bubista Cup to Sal Rei.  As Sal Rei were 2016 regional champions, Onze Estrelas qualified into the Super Cup runner-up in the cup.  Sal Rei was tied with a goal with Onze Estrelas, later the match was 2–1 and Sal Rei brought an ineligible player to the field.  As it was against the rules, the Super Cup was finished and Onze Estrelas was awarded 0–3 and won their only Super Cup title.

On December 3, 2017, Onze Estrelas got another achievement and is their only association cup title, the club finished first with 15 points and did not lost a single match, it was a point ahead of runner up Sal Rei.

Onze Estrelas started with an 0–1 win over last year's champion Sal Rei and contested a chance to win a championship title for Onze Estrelas. Since the start of 2018, the club had a four match winning streak and had 16 points, they were second as they scored nine goals, overall fourth ranked behind Sal Rei, Sporting and Académica Operária. That streak ended when they faced Sal Rei which ended in a loss and lost its polarity of trying to gain first place. Their situation got worst as they lose to Africa Show and became third, then a huge 1–6 loss to Académica Operária and was fourth and a smaller loss to Sanjoanense, they were sixth with 16 points, 5 wins and a draw sharing with Sporting, Onze Estrelas has 14 goals scored, 7 less than Sporting. Onze Estrelas made a 2–0 win over Juventude on March 11 and remains six with 19 points, also shared with Sporting and Onze Estrelas. With only six points fewer than first placed Sal Rei's, along Sporting and Sanjoanense, they had one last chance for a regional title, for Onze Estrelas, another one. Onze Estrelas defeated Estântia Baixo on March with the score 1–4 and shares its points with Sporting.  Wins made by Sal Rei and Académica Operária made Onze Unidos completely lost a chance for another championship title.

Since their first participation, their lowest position in the championships is third place in which they got it four times.

Stadium

The team plays at the stadium named Arsénio Ramos which it was completed on 9 February 2008 and first played in the 2010–11 season.

Honours
Boa Vista Island League: 1
2012/13

Boa Vista (Bubista) Cup: 1
2013/14

Boa Vista (Bubista) Super Cup: 1
2015/16

Boa Vista Island Opening Tournament: 1
2017

League and cup history

National championship

Island/Regional Championship

Statistics
Best position: 5th (Group A) – national
Best position at a cup competition: 1st (regional)
Best position at an Association Cup: 1st
Appearances at the regional cup competitions: 7
Appearances at a Super Cup competition: 3
Appearances at the Regional Championships: 7
Appearance at the National Championships: Once
Total goals scored: 4 (national)
Total points: 2 (national)
Total matches played (championship part): 103, to be 117 (regional and national)
Regional Championships: 98, to be 112
National Championships: 5
Total matches played together with the Super Cup: 106

Managerial history

References

External links
Onze Estrelas at kampion.com, retrieved on 13 September 2014
Boa Vista: Onze Estrelas Received Five Nominations A Semana 
 Onze Estrelas at Sports Mídia 

Football clubs in Cape Verde
Boa Vista Island League
1975 establishments in Cape Verde